The 2016 Africa T20 Cup was the second edition of the Africa T20 Cup, a Twenty20 cricket tournament that was held in South Africa from 2 September to 1 October 2016, as a curtain-raiser to the 2016–17 South African domestic season. Organised by Cricket South Africa, it featured thirteen South African provincial teams, as well as the national sides of Kenya, Namibia and Zimbabwe.

The sixteen participating teams were split into four pools of four, with the teams from each pool playing all of their matches at one ground across a single weekend. Defending champions Northerns were drawn in Pool B.

In Pool C four of the six matches were abandoned due to rain. Under the rules of the tournament, all the matches in that group were declared null and void. An elimination draw was then conducted with the captains of each team in the group, with Zimbabwe progressing to the finals section of the cup.

The Recreation Ground in Oudtshoorn was chosen at the venue for the semi-finals and final.

Eastern Province won the tournament, beating Northern Cape by 31 runs in the final.

Pool A

Squads

Points table

Fixtures

Pool B

Squads

Points table

Fixtures

Pool C

Squads

Points table

With four of the games being abandoned, an elimination draw was done with Zimbabwe progressing to the finals stage.

Fixtures

Pool D

Squads

Points table

Fixtures

Finals

Semi-finals

Final

References

External links
 Series home at ESPNCricinfo

2016
2016 in Kenyan cricket
2016 in Namibian sport
2016 in South African cricket
2016 in Zimbabwean cricket
International cricket competitions in 2016